is a Japanese professional sumo wrestler from Shima, Mie. He debuted in sumo wrestling in July 2012 and made his makuuchi debut in May 2019. His highest rank has been maegashira 3. He wrestles for Kise stable.

Background
Hamaguchi Koyo began sumo in elementary school and also practiced at a local sumo wrestling school. He also played baseball but chose to concentrate on sumo in his third year at Watsugu Junior High School. He was scouted by several professional sumo stables but was not recruited and chose to continue his education. He attended Meitoku Yoshitsune High School before studying Business Administration at Kinki University. He was part of the University's successful sumo team but made little impact at national level in individual competition.

Career

Early career
After graduating from university, he entered the Kise stable to prepare for a career in professional sumo. Like most new recruits he initially used his family name as his shikona and began his career as Hamaguchi. On his debut tournament (basho) in July 2012 he won all seven of his regular matches in the jonokuchi division but lost the championship in a play-off against his stablemate Iwasaki. He was promoted to jonidan for September and replicated his previous performance as he lost the play-off to Iwasaki after winning all seven of his bouts.

On Hamaguchi's debut in the fourth sandanme division in November 2012 he won four of his seven bouts to record a winning score or kachi-koshi. In the following tournament in January he was undefeated in seven matches to win the divisional championship (yusho) and secure promotion to the third, makushita level. Hamaguchi had winning records in his first two tournaments in makushita and in July he won two of his first three matches before losing to Chiyomaru. In the latter bout he sustained a serious injury to the anterior cruciate ligament and was forced to withdraw from the tournament. The injury was so severe that Hamaguchi was forced to sit out the next five basho and was relegated back to the lowest division.

In July 2014 Hamaguchi returned in the jonokuchi division and took the championship with a 7-0 record. Two months later he went undefeated in jonidan to win his second successive yusho. A 6-1 result in sandanme saw him promoted back to makushita in January 2015. He quickly established himself in the upper ranks of the division and in January 2016 he was narrowly denied a yusho when he was beaten in a play-off by his stablemate Ura. Winning records in the next two tournaments saw him promoted to the second juryo division for the first time for the July 2016 tournament. On his promotion he adopted the shikona Shimanoumi, which combines the name of his home town with the kanji for sea or ocean.

Shimanoumi's first appearance in juryo ended in failure as he won only four of his fifteen matches and was relegated back to makushita. Competing towards the top of the third division for the rest of 2016 and throughout 2017 he performed consistently before a 5-2 result in January 2018 secured his second promotion to juryo. He had mixed results in his next five tournaments and for the January 2019 basho he was ranked at juryo 13. Shimanoumi dominated the tournament, winning the yusho with a 13-2 record which included wins over Arawashi, Toyonoshima, Sokokurai, Ishiura, Takekaze and Chiyomaru. His success was not enough to secure promotion to the top makuuchi division but did see him ranked at juryo 1 in March. Needing only eight wins for promotion Shimanoumi exceeded his target as he repeated his 13-2 result from January and became the first wrestler since Tochinoshin in 2014 to win back-to-back juryo championships. His defeated opponents included Daishomaru, Kotoyuki, Daiamami, Kyokutaisei and Yutakayama.

Makuuchi career
Shimanoumi made his first appearance in the top division in May 2019 at the rank of maegashira 12. He struggled early in the tournament winning only two of his first six matches and by the end of day 9 he had a record of 4-5. In the second week of the basho he showed considerable improvement and won his last six bouts including wins over Yoshikaze, Kotoeko and Takarafuji. His 10-5 record saw him awarded the special prize for fighting spirit. Promoted to maegashira 6 for the July 2019 tournament he recorded an 8-7 result, securing his kachi-koshi with an uwatedashinage win over Aoiyama on day 14. He then found life in makuuchi more difficult, recording only one kachi-koshi in the next six tournaments, and he had fallen to the very bottom of the division at maegashira 17 by November 2020. He responded by mounting a challenge for the championship, sharing the lead with ōzeki Takakeishō with just a single loss after Day 12. He lost his final three matches to finish with an 11–4 record, but he received his second Fighting Spirit prize.

Fighting style
Shimanoumi has shown a preference for tsuki and oshi techniques which involve pushing and thrusting rather than grasping his opponent's mawashi or belt. His most common kimarite or winning move is oshidashi, the push-out.

Personal life
They were married on 19 June 2022. The next month Shimanoumi changed his legal surname to Fukuzono.

Career record

See also
Glossary of sumo terms
List of active sumo wrestlers
List of sumo tournament second division champions
Active special prize winners

References

1989 births
Living people
Japanese sumo wrestlers
Sumo people from Mie Prefecture